The long-trained nightjar (Macropsalis forcipata) is a species of nightjar in the family Caprimulgidae. It is found in Argentina and Brazil.

Taxonomy and systematics

Some authors have contended that the binomial Macropsalis creagra bestowed by Bonaparte in 1850 is correct, but consensus now is that the specific epithet forcipata has priority. The long-trained nightjar is the only member of its genus and is monotypic.

Description

The male long-trained nightjar has extremely long outer tail feathers from which the species gets its name. Both sex's upperparts are brown with spots and bars of grayish brown, tawny, buff, and cinnamon. The wings are similarly colored, with none of the white that others in family Caprimulgidae have. They have a broad tawny or tawny buff collar on the hindneck and a faint tawny patch on the throat. The breast is brown with tawny and buff bars and scallops, the belly and flanks buff with brown bars. The males elongated tail feathers have a broad white edge; the female's tail is darker and much shorter.

Distribution and habitat

The long-trained nightjar is found in southeastern Brazil from Minas Gerais and Espírito Santo south to Rio Grande do Sul and into Argentina's far northeasternmost province, Misiones. It has been recorded as a vagrant in Paraguay. It inhabits the interior and edges of primary and secondary forest and woodland.

Behavior

Feeding

The long-trained nightjar has been recorded foraging by sallies from the ground, by hawking prey in flight, and by taking prey from leaves in flight. Its diet has not been detailed but is assumed to be insects.

Breeding

The long-trained nightjar is thought to breed between November and January in most of its range. Males make a courtship display on the ground by raising their tail in a conspicuous white "V". Eggs are laid on the ground on leaf litter without a conventional nest; the site is often shaded by a bush. The female does most of the incubation.

Vocalization

Both sexes of long-trained nightjar make "a repetitive, high-pitched 'tsip, tsip, tsip, tsip' call."

Status

The IUCN originally assessed the long-trained nightjar as Threatened but since 2004 has rated it as being of Least Concern. It is variously rare, locally common, and common in different parts of its range.

References

long-trained nightjar
long-trained nightjar
Birds of the Atlantic Forest
long-trained nightjar
Taxonomy articles created by Polbot